Marcus Vinicius de Morais (born February 25, 1974) known by his given name, Marcus, is a Brazilian football player in Japan. He led all J2 League players in goals scored in the 2002 and 2003 season.

Career
Marcus Vinícius began playing football with São José Esporte Clube. He played for several Brazilian and Japanese clubs before finishing his career with São José in 2009.

While playing for Rio Branco Esporte Clube, Marcus Vinícius was the leading goal-scorer of the 2000 Campeonato Paulista with nine goals before suffering a knee injury.

After he retired from playing, Marcus Vinícius became a manager. He led São José during the 2015  Campeonato Paulista Série A3.

Club statistics

References

External links

Yokohama F-Marinos Official Website 

1974 births
Living people
Brazilian footballers
São José Esporte Clube players
Esporte Clube Guarani players
Rio Branco Esporte Clube players
América Futebol Clube (SP) players
Guarani FC players
Esporte Clube Bahia players
Brazilian expatriate footballers
Expatriate footballers in Japan
J1 League players
J2 League players
Japan Football League (1992–1998) players
Japan Football League players
Honda FC players
Albirex Niigata players
Kawasaki Frontale players
Tokyo Verdy players
Yokohama F. Marinos players
Association football midfielders
Association football forwards
São José Esporte Clube managers
Footballers from São Paulo